Holy Trinity Church, Matlock Bath is a Grade II listed parish church in the Church of England in Matlock Bath, Derbyshire.

History

The foundation stone was laid on 9 June 1841 when an inscription was enclosed in a glass vessel deposited in a cavity in the foundations. The inscription as recorded in the Sheffield Iris of 15 June 1841 read To the glory of God, and for the salvation of man, the first stone of a church, to be dedicated to the Holy Trinity, built and endowed by voluntary subscription, and designed for the worship of Almighty God, according to the doctrine and discipline of the Apostolic Reformed Church of England and Ireland, was laid by the Venerable Walter Augustus Shirley, M.A., Archdeacon of Derby, on Wednesday, the 9th of June, in the year of our Lord, 1841, and in the fourth year of the reign of her most gracious majesty Queen Victoria. The Rev. W. Melville, M.A., Rector of Matlock; Messrs. Weightman and Hadfield, Architects.
 
The church was built by John Grey Weightman and Matthew Ellison Hadfield of Sheffield and consecrated on 4 October 1842 by the Bishop of Hereford Rt. Revd. Thomas Musgrave (acting for the Bishop of Lichfield who was ill).

It was enlarged in 1873–74 by T.E. Streatfeild who added a south aisle, lengthened the chancel and added the vestry and organ chamber. The reredos was installed in 1874.

In the 1970s, the interior was re-ordered. The south aisle and west end of the nave were partitioned off and cleared. A baptistry was installed in the floor of the crossing, and the nave floors were raised.

Vicars of Holy Trinity

Stained glass
Nave window, Ward and Hughes 1889, the Good Samaritan
North transept, 1923, the Nativity.

Parish status
The church is in a United Benefice with St Mary's Church, Cromford.

Organ
The pipe organ was built by William Hill in 1876 at a cost of £350. It was opened on 18 April 1876 by Arthur Smith, organist of St Werburgh's Church, Derby. A specification of the organ can be found on the National Pipe Organ Register. It was replaced by an electronic instrument in 1975. The pipework remained until 1993 when it was dispersed.

Organists
Phyllis Wright 1944–1966

See also
Listed buildings in Matlock Bath

References

Matlock Bath
Matlock Bath
Churches completed in 1842